Philip Greenspun (born September 28, 1963) is an American computer scientist, educator, early Internet entrepreneur, and pilot who was a pioneer in developing online communities like photo.net.

Biography
Greenspun was born on September 28, 1963, grew up in Bethesda, Maryland, and received a B.S. in Mathematics from MIT in 1982.  After working for Hewlett Packard Research Labs in Palo Alto and Symbolics, he became a founder of ICAD, Inc.  Greenspun returned to MIT to study electrical engineering and computer science, eventually receiving a Ph.D. 

Working with Isaac Kohane of Boston Children's Hospital and Harvard Medical School, Greenspun was the developer of an early Web-based electronic medical record system. The system is described in "Building national electronic medical record systems via the World Wide Web" (1996). Greenspun and Kohane continue to work together on a medical informatics at Harvard Medical School. 

In 1995, Greenspun was hired to lead development of Hearst Corporation's Internet services, which included early e-commerce sites. In 1997 he co-founded ArsDigita, a web services company which grew to $20 million in annual revenues by 2000.

Photo.net and ArsDigita

In 1993, Greenspun founded photo.net, an online community for people helping each other to improve their photographic skills.  He seeded the community with "Travels with Samantha", a photo-illustrated account of a trip from Boston to Alaska and back. Photo.net became a business in 2000 with the help of some of his cofounders Rajeev Surati and Waikit Lau.  Having grown to 600,000 registered users, it was acquired by NameMedia in 2007 for $6 million, according to documents filed in connection with a planned public offering of NameMedia shares. Greenspun founded the open-source software company ArsDigita and, as CEO, grew it to about $20 million in revenue before taking a venture capital investment.

Greenspun was an early developer of database-backed Web sites, which became the dominant approach to engineering sites with user contributions, e.g., Amazon.com. Greenspun was also a developer of one of the first Web-based electronic medical record systems. Greenspun's Oracle-based community site LUSENET was an important early host of free forums.

Aviation
Greenspun was employed as a commercial pilot for Delta Air Lines subsidiary Comair from 2008 until it ceased operation in 2012. According to the FAA Airmen registry, Greenspun holds an Airline Transport Pilot License and Flight Instructor certificates for both airplanes and helicopters, as well as type ratings for two turbojet-powered airplanes. Greenspun is listed as an instructor at the East Coast Aero Club and was interviewed by NPR regarding the success of a Groupon helicopter lesson offer.

Publications

Greenspun has written several textbooks on developing Internet applications, including Philip and Alex's Guide to Web Publishing, SQL for Web Nerds, and Software Engineering for Internet Applications, the textbook for an MIT course. Greenspun is the editor of Medical School 2020, which provides a first-person account by a medical student.

Teaching

Greenspun and his co-founders at ArsDigita started a non-profit foundation that ran the ArsDigita Prize, an award for young web developers, and the ArsDigita University, a tuition-free one-year program teaching the core computer science curriculum, one course at a time. Winners of the Prize include a 12 year old Aaron Swartz.

Greenspun has taught electrical engineering and computer science at MIT. One of Greenspun's most famous students is Randal Pinkett, who built an online community for low-income housing residents in Greenspun's 6.171 Software Engineering for Internet Applications course.  Pinkett went on to win NBC TV show The Apprentice. In 2003, Greenspun helped teach a newly designed circuits and electronics course at MIT.

In January 2011 and again in January 2012, Greenspun taught an intensive RDBMS/SQL programming course at MIT using Google Docs to coordinate classroom instruction.

Charitable work

In 2007, Greenspun donated $20,000 to Wikimedia Foundation to start a project fund for the payment of illustrators to supply illustrations for use on Wikimedia Foundation projects.

Greenspun is a volunteer for Angel Flight and, on December 6, 2010, assisted in the first nationally arranged kidney paired-donation in which kidneys were flown from Lebanon, New Hampshire to St. Louis and vice versa.

In December 2013, Greenspun donated $10,000 to Kids on Computers (KOC), a 501(c)(3) non-profit which sets up computer labs in areas where kids do not have access to technology. In recognition of Greenspun's donation, the KOC lab at Escuela Manuel Gonzalez Gatica was named the Gittes Family Lab in honor of his grandfather. Avni Khatri, President of  Kids on Computers in 2012 credits his time at ArsDigita for him learning the value of FOSS and how it can help bridge and connect virtual and real-world communities.

See also
 Greenspun's tenth rule

References

External links
 
 
 Photo Net
 E-Mail Alerts Show Growing Potential
 early work in internet application development
 audio interview with Philip Greenspun at IT Conversations
 "Software Engineering for Web Applications" course given at ArsDigita University

ArsDigita histories 
 Philip Greenspun
 Lars Pind
 
 Michael Yoon

1963 births
Living people
American aviators
American male bloggers
American bloggers
American computer businesspeople
American computer scientists
American philanthropists
American photographers
American technology writers
Massachusetts Institute of Technology School of Science alumni
People from Bethesda, Maryland
Commercial aviators
21st-century American non-fiction writers